Corpus was the second album by Sebastian Santa Maria, released posthumously in 1997.

Track listing
 "It's about"  – 4:27
 "Rock & sands"  – 3:51
 "Susan & Pearl"  – 4:11
 "Mister Altmann"  – 3:30
 "Lift your hands (Part 1)"  – 0:41
 "Never mind"  – 2:50
 "Lift your hands (Part 2)"  – 0:30
 "Aye más c'est so"  – 4:37
 "Love's being there"  – 4:43
 "Juan"  – 3:34
 "She shines (Latin version)"  – 3:48
 "Way out way in"  – 4:06
 "Sin título"  – 1:59

1997 albums
Albums published posthumously